is a private women's junior college in Kashiwara, Osaka, Japan.

External links
  

Japanese junior colleges
Educational institutions established in 1965
Private universities and colleges in Japan
Universities and colleges in Osaka Prefecture
Women's universities and colleges in Japan

Kashiwara, Osaka
1965 establishments in Japan